Thomas Dunne (born 1863) was an Irish hurler who played for the Kerry senior team.

Dunne was a regular member of the starting twenty-one during Kerry's must successful hurling period shortly after the foundation of the Gaelic Athletic Association and the start of the inter-county championship. During his career he won one All-Ireland medal and one Munster medal.

At club level Dunne was a one-time county club championship medalist with Ballyduff.

References

1863 births
Year of death missing
Ballyduff (Kerry) hurlers
Kerry inter-county hurlers
All-Ireland Senior Hurling Championship winners